Bernadette Maria Jagger (born 26 February 1958 in Riemvasmaak, South Africa) is a Namibian politician. She is a member of SWAPO and became appointed to the party's Central Committee in 2012. In 2015 she won a seat in parliament. In a cabinet reshuffle in February 2018 she was appointed Deputy Minister of Environment and Tourism, succeeding Tommy Nambahu.

Jagger is a teacher by profession. She holds certificates in lower and higher primary education from Sohnge Training College and University of Namibia, respectively, and rose through the ranks from being a teacher in 1976, a deputy principal in 1992, to the Kunene Regional Director of Education in 2012. Jagger also obtained a Post Graduate Diploma in English Language Teaching and Administration from the University of Warwick, and a Bachelor of Philosophy in Education from the University of Exeter.

Jagger is a senior councillor of the Riemvasmakers community, a clan of the Nama people.

References

1958 births
Living people
People from the Northern Cape
21st-century Namibian women politicians
Women members of the National Assembly (Namibia)
Members of the National Assembly (Namibia)
SWAPO politicians
University of Namibia alumni
Alumni of the University of Warwick
Alumni of the University of Exeter
21st-century Namibian politicians